Mouhamad Ali Chamass (born 25 February 1987) is a Lebanese former footballer who played as a midfielder.

Club career 
Chamass signed for Lebanese Premier League side Nejmeh's youth sector on 2 July 2004, and was promoted to the first team ahead of the 2006–07 season.

Honours
Nejmeh
 Lebanese Premier League: 2008–09, 2013–14
 Lebanese FA Cup: 2015–16
 Lebanese Elite Cup: 2014, 2016
 Lebanese Super Cup: 2009, 2014, 2016

Individual
 Lebanese Premier League Team of the Season: 2010–11

See also
 List of Lebanon international footballers

References

External links 
 
 
 

1987 births
Living people
Footballers from Beirut
Association football midfielders
Lebanese footballers
Lebanon international footballers
Lebanese Premier League players
Nejmeh SC players
Al Shabab Al Arabi Club Beirut players
Safa SC players